Stephen Donaldson may refer to:

 Stephen R. Donaldson (born 1947), author
 Stephen Donaldson (activist) (1946–1996), LGBT activist